Karl Tryggvason (born March 17, 1947) is an Icelandic medical researcher.

Karl Tryggvason was born in Reykjavik. He trained as a medical doctor at Finland's University of Oulu, where he graduated with an M.D. in 1975 and with a Ph.D. in 1977 with doctoral dissertation Glomeruli and their basement membrane in the normal human kidney and in congenital nephrotic syndrome of the Finnish type. At the University of Oulu for the academic years from 1974 to 1978 and in 1979, he was an assistant in the medical biochemistry department. For the academic year 1978–1979 he was a visiting associate at the NIH's National Institute of Dental Research (now called the National Institute of Dental and Craniofacial Research) in Bethesda, Maryland. For the academic year 1979–1980 he was an assistant of clinical chemistry in the resident program of the University Hospital of Oulu. For the academic year 1983–1984 he was a visiting associate professor of biochemistry and clinical pathology at Rutgers New Jersey Medical School. From 1986 to 1989 he was a senior investigator in the Academy of Finland. From 1987 to 1995 he was a professor of biochemistry and chair of the biochemistry department of the University of Oulu's Faculty of Science — during those year he was also from 1989 to 1994 a research professor at The Finnish Cancer Institute (located the University of Oulu). Karl Tryggvason was appointed in 1994 a professor of medical chemistry in the Karolinska Institute's Department of Biochemistry and Biophysics and in 2012 the Tanoto Professor in Diabetes Research at Singapore's Duke–NUS Medical School. He is a member of the Nobel Assembly at the Karolinska Institute as a member of the Nobel Committee for physiology and medicine. He was in 1986 one of the founders of Biocenter Oulu, Finland's first elite center in biomedical research, which became a biomedical research model for other Finnish universities. 

His research focuses on the basement membranes, which interface between the overlying epithelial tissues and the underlying connective tissue. The research group under his leadership has identified and developed diagnostics for five serious genetic diseases, caused by mutations in genes for proteins that build up the human body's basement membrane.

Karl Tryggvason is the author or co-author of more than 400 research articles. In 2008 he was the co-founder of BioLamina AB, a Swedish biotechnology company that produces laminins for cell therapy and research in cell biology.

He was elected in 1992 a member of the Finnish Academy of Science and Letters and was appointed in 2001 an Honorary Doctor of the University of Iceland. He received in 1995 the University of Oulu's Professor Pentti Kaiser Award, in 2000 the American Society of Nephrology's Homer W. Smith Award, and in 2002 the Fondation Louis-Jeantet's Louis-Jeantet Prize for Medicine. In 2005 he was elected a member of Academia Europaea and a foreign member of the Royal Swedish Academy of Sciences.

Selected publications

References

20th-century Icelandic physicians
21st-century Icelandic physicians
20th-century Icelandic scientists
Physician-scientists
University of Oulu alumni
Academic staff of the Karolinska Institute
Members of the Finnish Academy of Science and Letters
Members of the Royal Swedish Academy of Sciences
Members of Academia Europaea
1947 births
Living people